David Edgar Herold (June 16, 1842 – July 7, 1865) was an American pharmacist's assistant and accomplice of John Wilkes Booth in the assassination of Abraham Lincoln on April 14, 1865. After the shooting, Herold accompanied Booth to the home of Dr. Samuel Mudd, who set Booth's injured leg. The two men then continued their escape through Maryland and into Virginia, and Herold remained with Booth until the authorities cornered them in a barn. Herold surrendered, but Booth was shot and died two hours later. Herold was tried by a military tribunal, sentenced to death for conspiracy, and hanged with three other conspirators at the Washington Arsenal, now known as Fort Lesley J. McNair.

Biography

Early life
David E. Herold was born in Maryland, the sixth of 9 children of Adam George Herold (1803–1864) and Mary Ann Porter (1810–1883). Adam and Mary were married on November 9, 1828, in Washington, DC. David was their only son to survive to adulthood. His father Adam was the Chief Clerk of the Naval Storehouse at the Washington Navy Yard for over 20 years. Herold's family was well-off financially and lived in a large brick house at 636 Eighth Street SE in Washington, D.C., near the Washington Navy Yard. David attended Gonzaga College High School, Georgetown College, Charlotte Hall Military Academy (at Charlotte Hall, St. Mary's County, Maryland), and the Rittenhouse Academy. In 1860 Herold received a certificate in pharmacy from Georgetown College. He then worked as a pharmacist's assistant and as a clerk for a doctor and was an avid hunter. He became acquainted with John Surratt while attending Charlotte Hall Military Academy classes in the late 1850s. A few years later, in December 1864, Surratt introduced him to John Wilkes Booth.

Assassination plot

Herold and a group of co-conspirators had originally plotted to kidnap Lincoln, but later decided to kill him, Vice President Andrew Johnson, and Secretary of State William H. Seward in a bid to help the Confederacy's cause.

On the night of April 14, 1865, Herold guided Lewis Powell to Seward's house. Inside, Powell attempted to kill Seward, severely wounding him and other members of his household. The ensuing commotion frightened Herold and he rode off, leaving Powell to fend for himself. He then met with Booth outside of Washington, D.C., and they proceeded to Surrattsville, Maryland (now Clinton, Maryland) where they picked up weapons that Mary Surratt had left earlier for them at her property. Another conspirator, George Atzerodt, was supposed to kill Vice President Andrew Johnson, but never made the attempt after thinking it over.

It was at this point that John Wilkes Booth shot Lincoln at Ford's Theater. When Booth jumped onto the stage of Ford's Theater, some witnesses speculate that he broke his fibula. When Booth went across the bridge into Maryland, he met Herold there. They retrieved their weapons cache from a saloon and proceeded to the home of Dr. Samuel Mudd, who set Booth's leg. Mudd let Booth and Herold rest at his home for a few hours. The pair headed to the house of Samuel Cox, a Confederate sympathizer. He refused to let the two into his house and insisted they stay in a thicket behind his house. He continued to bring food, whiskey, and newspapers to Booth and Herold where Booth realized he wasn't a hero (like Marcus Junius Brutus) as he longed to be, written in his diary. After a close encounter with the Union, Herold slaughtered the horses he and Booth rode, worrying they would give the two away. Cox later gave Booth a skiff to cross the Potomac River. Due to a foggy night, Herold and Booth landed in Maryland, not in Virginia as planned. They threatened a farmer and forced him and his family to sleep outside, as they slept in the bedrooms. They left in the morning and requested to stay at another farm owned by Richard Henry Garrett. Unaware of what they had done, he accepted. After Booth got drunk, Garrett made the two sleep in the barn. Soon, they woke to the sounds of horses.

Herold and Booth were trapped by Union soldiers on April 26, 1865. Herold surrendered, but Booth refused to lay down his arms and was shot by Sergeant Boston Corbett through a crack in the barn wall. He died a few hours later.

Trial and execution
Herold was tried before a military tribunal. As he had already admitted his involvement in the assassination conspiracy, the only defense his lawyer Frederick Stone could offer was that Herold was feeble-minded and under undue influence from Booth. His defense being unsuccessful, Herold was convicted and sentenced to death. He was hanged in Washington, D.C. on July 7, 1865. The fall from the gallows did not break his neck; he struggled for nearly five minutes, slowly strangling to death.

On February 15, 1869, Herold's mother and five of his sisters interred his remains in Congressional Cemetery in Washington, D.C. in an unmarked grave, next to the grave of his father Adam. The gravestone memorializing David now present in Congressional Cemetery was placed there in July 1917, at the time of the burial of his sister Mary Alice (Herold) Nelson (October 16, 1837 – July 1, 1917) in the cemetery. Mary Alice was the wife of Frederick Massena Nelson (January 1827 – May 11, 1909) of Pomonkey, Charles County, Maryland.

Cultural references
Gore Vidal's fictionalized account of Lincoln's presidency, Lincoln, includes a heavy focus on David Herold. In the Afterword, where Vidal explains the extent to which his novel is true to fact, he writes, "As David's life is largely unknown until Booth's conspiracy, I have invented a low-life for him."

In the Stephen Sondheim musical Assassins, David Herold appears in the song "The Ballad of Booth", where Booth forces Herold at gunpoint to write why Booth killed Lincoln. However, when soldiers surround the barn where they hide, Herold runs.

David Herold is played by Troy Acree in Season 4, Episode 2 of Unsolved Mysteries which explored the mystery of whether John Wilkes Booth actually escaped capture and died in 1903. This episode first aired on September 25, 1991.

References

External links
 
 David Herold
 Spartacus Educational on David Herold
 Dr. Samuel A. Mudd Research Site

1842 births
1865 deaths
19th-century executions by the United States
19th-century executions of American people
1865 crimes in the United States
Burials at the Congressional Cemetery
Executed people from Maryland
Georgetown College (Georgetown University) alumni
Gonzaga College High School alumni
Lincoln assassination conspirators
People executed by the United States military by hanging
People of Washington, D.C., in the American Civil War
Civilians who were court-martialed